Edward J. Burrow (8 June 1869, Wellington, Somerset – 19 September 1934, Cheltenham) was a prodigious engraver and founder of Edward J. Burrow and Co., a printing and publishing firm.

Beginning in the years before the First World War Burrow published more than 500 travel guides in a series titled The "Borough" Pocket Guides (also known as The "Borough" Guides) to various localities of the British Isles and some parts of the Continent. In the 1920s he published a book series titled Burrow's "RAC" Guides, which were issued under the auspices of the Royal Automobile Club Touring Department. In the 1930s he issued another series named Burrow's Grey Guides.

References

External links
 The "Borough" Guide to Clonmel, Cheltenham: Edward J. Burrow, ca. 1901 (The "Borough" Pocket Guides, 456).

1869 births
1934 deaths
British book publishers (people)
British printers
British engravers